The Fifty Percent Women or Nothing Dynamic is a campaigning group based in South Kivu, uniting several civil society women's organizations in the Democratic Republic of the Congo. The group calls for full implementation of Article 14 of the Constitution, which guarantees gender parity in the management of public affairs at national, provincial and local level.

History
In April 2019 the Dynamic supported the candidacy of Jeanine Mabunda for the presidency of the National Assembly.

In November 2019 the Dynamic launched a series of protests in South Kivu, objecting to decrees and decisions of Governor Théo Ngwabidje which excluded women from provincial government:
 

In January 2021, amid negotiations over forming a government reflecting the 'Sacred Union of the Nation', the group called on President Félix Tshisekedi to ensure that women MPs played a full role in the resulting national government.

References

External links
 La dynamique 50% des femmes ou rien

2019 establishments in the Democratic Republic of the Congo
Feminist organisations in the Democratic Republic of the Congo